Slap ob Idrijci is a settlement on the right bank of the Idrijca River in the Municipality of Tolmin in the Littoral region of Slovenia.

Name
The name of the settlement was changed from Slap to Slap ob Idrijci in 1955.

Notable people
Notable people that were born or lived in Slap ob Idrijci include:
 Ciril Kosmač (1910–1980), writer

Gallery

References

External links
Slap ob Idrijci on Geopedia

Populated places in the Municipality of Tolmin